Pioneer Park is located in Tumwater, Washington, on the Deschutes River. 

The park is equipped for a variety of court and field sports and visitors can access the river. The park's terrain is flat and contains a wheelchair accessible, partially paved loop trail covering . There is a playground area and several picnic locations.

Pioneer Park is used as a primary viewing location from which to watch firework displays during the city of Tumwater's July 4th celebrations.

References

External links
 City of Tumwater - Pioneer Park page

Parks in Washington (state)
Parks in Thurston County, Washington